The 2016 Belarusian Premier League was the 26th season of top-tier football in Belarus. The season began on 1 April 2016 and concluded on 27 November 2016. BATE Borisov were the defending champions, having won their 12th league title last year; they successfully defended their title this season.

Teams

Three best teams of 2015 First League (Isloch Minsk Raion, Gorodeya and Krumkachy Minsk) were promoted to the league, which was expanded from 14 to 16 clubs.

The last-placed team of 2015 Premier League, Gomel, were relegated.

 1 Isloch Minsk Raion hosted their games at City Stadium in Molodechno due to previously used by them RCOP-BGU Stadium in Minsk not meeting Premier League criteria.
 2 Krumkachy Minsk hosted their games at FC Minsk Stadium in Minsk due to previously used by them SOK Olimpiysky in Minsk not meeting Premier League criteria.

League table

Results
Each team played twice against every other team for a total of 30 matches.

Top goalscorers

Updated to games played on 27 November 2016 Source: football.by

See also
2016 Belarusian First League
2015–16 Belarusian Cup
2016–17 Belarusian Cup

References

External links
 

2016
Belarus
Belarus
1